Rivula everta is a moth of the family Erebidae first described by Charles Swinhoe in 1901. It is found in Australia in Queensland and the Northern Territory.

References

"Species Rivula everta Swinhoe, 1901". Australian Faunal Directory. Archived 9 October 2012.

Moths of Australia
Hypeninae
Moths described in 1901